Boulevard Gréber (or Gréber Boulevard) is an important principal arterial road in Gatineau, Quebec. It runs from Montee Paiement to the Gatineau River. It is named after French urban planner Jacques Gréber. It was once part of Route 148 of the provincial network.

The southern part of the route includes numerous stores, restaurants, gentlemen's clubs and motels. About 1 km north of Boulevard Maloney (or Maloney Boulevard) it travels through a residential area with apartment buildings on the west side and small houses on the east side.

Most of the road has four lanes as the traffic flow is quite heavy particularly near the junction with Autoroute 50 and the commercial district. On the southern stretch between La Savane and the Lady Aberdeen Bridge there is a bus lane for STO routes, since most express routes and regular direct routes towards Ottawa travel via Greber. The STO has built three park-and-ride facilities in the vicinity so that passengers can take advantage of the transit priority measures. Express buses employ a closed-door policy in which they generally skip the stops in the designated lane section. The STO is looking at the possibility of extending the reserved lanes further north.

North of Boulevard La Verendrye, it becomes a two-lane arterial road that runs beside Autoroute 50 for much of its length until it ends near the Terrasses Paiement/Ravin Boises residential neighbourhood at Montee Paiement just south of the Highway 50 interchange. It is also the site of the Gatineau sector's largest industrial sector (second behind the Richelieu Industrial Park in the Hull sector). The northern and eastern end of the road was formerly called Rue Scullion prior to the 2002 amalgamation that formed a new larger City of Gatineau.

Les Promenades Gatineau, Ottawa-Gatineau's largest shopping centre is located on the east side of the road south of Boulevard Maloney. Costco built a new store right beside Gréber in 2006, and moved their operations there from a location in the northern part of the city. Several other malls such as the Village Greber and Place de la Savane are located beside and across from Les Promenades, making the area the most important commercial zone in the old city of Gatineau.

Near the Lady Aberdeen Bridges is one of the most historical churches in the Outaouais region, the St-Francois de Sales church, which was built in 1840.

Greber and Maloney intersection 

The intersection with Maloney is considered one of the busiest and most congested across the city as motorists often form long lineups waiting to turn north or south onto Gréber. It is also considered one of the most dangerous intersections, because the traffic flow is very high and train tracks are located just to the north of the intersection. Several serious incidents, some fatal, have occurred in the past several years.

The intersection will also be the site of significant construction as the STO is planning to build its Rapibus transit roadway alongside the tracks, and a station called Gréber is also part of the plans. The construction will likely affect travel in the area in a couple of years.

Neighbourhoods

 Pointe-Gatineau
 Le Baron
 Du Carrefour
 Ravins Boises-Terrasses Paiement
 Mont-Royal/Cote-des-Neiges

See also
 List of Gatineau roads

References 

Greber